Cristian Cerioni (born 14 January 1991) is an Italian rugby union player.
His usual position is as a centre. He plays for Mogliano in Top10.

References 

It's Rugby England Profile
Eurosport Profile
Ultimate Rugby Profile

1991 births
Living people
Italian rugby union players
Rugby union centres
Mogliano Rugby players